The Bilk Creek Mountains are a mountain range in Humboldt County, Nevada, and Harney County, Oregon.

References 

Mountain ranges of Nevada
Mountain ranges of Oregon
Mountain ranges of Humboldt County, Nevada
Mountain ranges of Harney County, Oregon